Elachista jaskai is a moth of the family Elachistidae that is found in northern Russia.

References

jaskai
Moths described in 1998
Endemic fauna of Russia
Moths of Europe